Marco Cecchinato was the defending champion but lost in the semifinals to Federico Delbonis.

Guido Pella won the title after Delbonis retired trailing 2–6, 1–2.

Seeds

Draw

Finals

Top half

Bottom half

References
Main Draw
Qualifying Draw

Aspria Tennis Cup - Singles
2017 Singles